The Little Animal Farm is an Italian pig sanctuary located in Airasca, Piedmont. Founded by Federica Trivelli in 2009, the site currently houses 20 pigs across four sties.

References

External links

Animal sanctuaries
2009 establishments in Italy